Mikhail Petrovich Sidko (born 1936, Kyiv) is a chemical engineer, inventor, and honoured innovator of the Ukrainian SSR. He is the last living survivor of the Babi Yar massacre.

Biography
The family of Mikhail Sidko was to be evacuated by train, but because, that the elder brother forgot to release the pigeons - they got off him.

On 28 September 1941, 2,000 ads in Russian were posted in Kyiv, Ukrainian and German: “All the Jews of the city of Kyiv and its environs should appear Monday 29 September 1941 by 8 o'clock in the morning at the corner of Melnikovskaya and Degtyarnaya streets (near the cemetery). Take your documents with you, valuables, as well as warm clothes and underwear. Who will not comply with this order, will be shot".

On 29 September, neighbours convinced my mother not to go to the gathering place, since the husband is Ukrainian and the children are Ukrainian and they returned home.

On 30 September, the housekeeper Lushka brought the Germans to us, and the family was sent to Babi Yar. In the drive, Mikhail and his brother and several children were pulled out of the column by a German officer and a policeman. The policeman shouted: "rozbigaytes", shot in the air, and killed two guys, the rest fled home.

A week later, the janitor Lushka again handed over to the Gestapo. Their neighbour, Ivan Volksdeutsch, was the interpreter for the Gestapo. He told the Germans that Mikhail and his brother were Ukrainians, and they were released.

Later, a neighbour settled with them - Sofia Krivorot-Baklanova with her daughter Galina. During the raids, Sofya Kondratyevna said, that Mikhail and his brother are her children, daughter - that they are her brothers. In 2004, the title of Righteous Among the Nations was awarded to Galina Elizarovna and Sofya Krivorot-Baklanova (posthumously).

Mikhail and his brother were stealing coal at the railway station, were caught and ended up in the Syrets death camp, where medical experiments were performed on them: froze feet, planted an encephalitis tick, gave injections. In the winter of 1942-1943, Grisha (brother) fled and in 1943 he kidnapped Mikhail.

After the war, Mikhail Sidko completed his studies at school, and from the age of 13 he worked as a shoemaker, served in the army and settled in Cherkasy, where he worked at a chemical plant. After retirement he immigrated to Israel in 2000.

Links 
 Interview with Mikhail Sidko (video) https://www.youtube.com/watch?v=SJzV7QOWHnA

References

1936 births
Living people
Holocaust survivors
Babi Yar